Black Rock State Park is a seasonal public recreation area adjoining Mattatuck State Forest in the town of Watertown, Connecticut. The park is managed by the Connecticut Department of Energy and Environmental Protection.

History
The park saw its origins in 1926 with the donation of 19 parcels totaling 254 acres by the citizen's conservation group Black Rock Forest, Inc. The Civilian Conservation Corps contributed to the park's development in the 1930s.

Activities and amenities
The park is crossed by the Mattatuck Trail, which offers scenic views of the Naugatuck Valley; side trails have views of Black Rock Lake and Black Rock Pond. Swimming and fishing are offered on Black Rock Pond. The park's campground has 78 campsites, available seasonally.

References

External links

Black Rock State Park Connecticut Department of Energy and Environmental Protection
Black Rock State Park Map Connecticut Department of Energy and Environmental Protection

State parks of Connecticut
Parks in Litchfield County, Connecticut
Protected areas established in 1926
1926 establishments in Connecticut
Civilian Conservation Corps in Connecticut
Land Gifts of the White Memorial Foundation
Watertown, Connecticut
Campgrounds in Connecticut